Miroslav Filipko (born 23 September 1973) is a Slovak former football goalkeeper currently Sport Director of Pohronie.

Club career 
He returned to Spartak Trnava in June 2012.

External links
 Guardian Football

References

1973 births
Living people
Slovak footballers
Association football goalkeepers
Hapoel Rishon LeZion F.C. players
Hapoel Tzafririm Holon F.C. players
Iraklis Thessaloniki F.C. players
Super League Greece players
1. FC Slovácko players
SK Dynamo České Budějovice players
Czech First League players
FC Petržalka players
MFK Ružomberok players
FC Spartak Trnava players
Slovak Super Liga players
Expatriate footballers in Greece
Expatriate footballers in Israel
Expatriate footballers in the Czech Republic
Slovak expatriate sportspeople in Israel
Sportspeople from Banská Bystrica